Claude Bouton, Lord of Corbaron (died, 30 June 1556) was an important courtier; poet and diplomate.

Family 
He was married in 1514 to Jacqueline of Lannoy, granddaughter of Baldwin of Lannoy.

Career 
In 1544 he was appointed as governor of Willem; Prince of Orange. He served at the court of Marie of Hungarye. Later; Bouton was member of the Council of State of Emperor Charles V. He is the author of the "Mirouer des Dames", written between 1517 and 1523. Bouton had an important collection of books, amongst them the Douze dames de rhétorique.

Burial 
He is buried inside the Church of the Sablon, Brussels. He had a private chapel constructed for his grave. Their grave is known for its unusual depiction of the couple.

References

16th-century diplomats
Lannoy family